Noom Diawara (born 26 December 1978) is a French actor. He is known for playing the role of Charles in Serial (Bad) Weddings.

References

External links

 

1978 births
Living people
21st-century French male actors
French male film actors
French male television actors
Male actors from Paris
French people of Malian descent